Tadolini is a surname of Italian origin. Notable people with this surname include:

 Adamo Tadolini (1788–1863), Italian neo-classical sculptor
 Eugenia Tadolini (née Savorani; 1809–1872), Italian operatic soprano
 Francesco Tadolini (1723–1805), Italian architect of the neoclassic period
 Giovanni Tadolini (1789–1872), Italian composer, conductor and singing instructor
 Giulio Tadolini (1849–1918), Academic-trained Italian sculptor
 Scipione Tadolini (1822–1893), Italian sculptor

Italian-language surnames